The 2021–22 Ukrainian Premier League season, referred to as the VBet Liha for sponsorship reasons, was the 31st top-level football club competition since the fall of the Soviet Union and the 14th since the establishment of the Ukrainian Premier League. On 1 July 2021 UPL announced that the new title sponsor for the next three years will be another bookmaking company, VBet.

The defending champions were the 16-time winners Dynamo Kyiv.

The competition was terminated at the UPL extraordinary general meeting on 26 April due to the 2022 Russian invasion of Ukraine. The league decided that it will not award a champion's title since the season was terminated early, yet the club's league standing would be used to determine qualification to clubs' continental competitions. The meeting was also attended by a number of the Ukrainian Association of Football (UAF) officials, among which was the first vice-president Oleh Protasov. The UPL general meeting decision was submitted to UAF Executive Committee for approval. On 2 May 2022 the UAF Executive Committee confirmed early termination of season in the league. A further EGM was held on May 27 to decide promotion and relegation. This confirmed that Desna Chernihiv and Mariupol had both withdrawn from the league for the following campaign due to damage and destruction in their respective cities and facilities because of the war. Metalist Kharkiv and Kryvbas Kryvyi Rih, who were the top two teams in the First League at the time of abandonment, were selected to be promoted by UAF.

Preparation 
The 2021–22 season expanded again to 16 teams as part of the league's expansion plan.

Due to the low-intensity war with Russia that had been ongoing since 2014, teams from the Donbas area were forced to play elsewhere.

Due to the ongoing  COVID-19 pandemic, attendance of football matches is limited and regulated by local health departments in each region.

Because of a conflict between the president of Olimpik Donetsk Vladyslav Helzin and the Ukrainian Association of Football officials over a post-match incident that culminated in sanctions against the Olimpik's president, Helzin decided to voluntarily withdraw his football club from the Ukrainian Premier League and transfer away ownership of the club. The decision took place just a couple of weeks before the start of the new season, with the calendar already set. Both PFL and UPL called on emergency clubs' meetings to confirm changes and reinstate membership of the already relegated Mynai in the UPL and relegate Olimpik Donetsk to the second tier (First League) instead. Due to this, the Round 1 match between Dynamo and its visiting opponent was suspended until a later date.

The second half of the season was expected to start on February 25 with the Round 19 game Mynai – Zorya but was suspended due to a full-scale Russian invasion earlier on February 24. Later the President of Ukraine announced a martial law until April 25 and all sports events were forced to be suspended. With the open hostilities continued, it was decided to cancel the season earlier than May 21.

Teams
This season, as it was announced earlier, the Ukrainian Premier League has been expanded to 16 teams, which includes 13 teams from the previous season and the top three teams from the 2020–21 Ukrainian First League.

Promoted teams
 Veres Rivne – the champion of the 2020–21 Ukrainian First League (return after a three-year absence)
 Chornomorets Odesa – runner-up of the 2020–21 Ukrainian First League (return after a two-year absence)
 Metalist 1925 Kharkiv– third place of the 2020–21 Ukrainian First League (debut, another club Metalist Kharkiv last competed in 2015–16)

Relegated teams
 Olimpik Donetsk – the 13th place team of the 2020–21 Ukrainian Premier League (ending their seven-year stay in the top-flight)

Location map

Stadiums 

Three of the qualified to the date teams play their matches outside of home towns. The minimum threshold for the stadium's capacity in the UPL is 5,000 (Article 10, paragraph 7.2).

The following stadiums are regarded as home grounds:

Notes

Personnel and sponsorship

Managerial changes 

Notes:
 In the UPL match protocols, Mykola Tsymbal remains the manager of Mynai despite the official club's announcement about return of Vasyl Kobin.

League table

Results
Teams play each other twice on a home and away basis.

Season statistics

Top goalscorers

Assists

Clean sheets

Hat-tricks

Awards

Monthly awards

Round awards

See also 
 2021–22 Ukrainian First League
 2021–22 Ukrainian Second League
 2021–22 Ukrainian Football Amateur League
 2021–22 Ukrainian Women's League
 2021–22 Ukrainian Cup
 Global Tour for Peace
 List of Ukrainian football transfers summer 2021

Notes

References

External links 
 Official website of the Ukrainian Premier League
 The season's calendar planner. Ukrainian Association of Football (MS spreadsheet)
 The season's calendar planner. Ukrainian Premier League. (pdf format)

Ukrainian Premier League seasons
1
Ukraine
Sports events affected by the 2022 Russian invasion of Ukraine